John II (26 April 1319 – 8 April 1364), called John the Good (French: Jean le Bon), was King of France from 1350 until his death in 1364. When he came to power, France faced several disasters: the Black Death, which killed nearly 40% of its population; popular revolts known as Jacqueries; free companies (Grandes Compagnies) of routiers who plundered the country; and English aggression that resulted in catastrophic military losses, including the Battle of Poitiers of 1356, in which John was captured.

While John was a prisoner in London, his son Charles became regent and faced several rebellions, which he overcame. To liberate his father, he concluded the Treaty of Brétigny (1360), by which France lost many territories and paid an enormous ransom.  In an exchange of hostages, which included his second son Louis, Duke of Anjou, John was released from captivity to raise funds for his ransom. Upon his return to France, he created the franc to stabilize the currency and tried to get rid of the free companies by sending them to a crusade, but Pope Innocent VI died shortly before their meeting in Avignon. When John was informed that Louis had escaped from captivity, he voluntarily returned to England, where he died in 1364. He was succeeded by his son Charles V.

Early life
John was nine years old when his father had been crowned as Philip VI of France. Philip VI's ascent to the throne was unexpected: previously, several of Philip IV's sons and successors had died without sons and heirs themselves, and so because of Salic law, all female descendants of John's uncle Philip the Fair were passed over; it was also disputed because it bypassed the claim of a closer relative of Philip the Fair, Edward III of England, his grandson through his daughter Isabella. Thus, as the new King of France, John's father Philip VI had to consolidate his power in order to protect his throne from rival claimants; therefore, he decided to marry off his son John quickly at the age of thirteen to form a strong matrimonial alliance, at the same time conferring upon him the title of Duke of Normandy.

Search for a wife and first marriage

Initially a marriage with Eleanor of Woodstock, sister of King Edward III of England, was considered, but instead Philip invited John of Luxembourg, King of Bohemia, to Fontainebleau. Bohemia had aspirations to control Lombardy and needed French diplomatic support. A treaty was drawn up. The military clauses stipulated that, in the event of war, Bohemia would support the French army with four hundred infantrymen. The political clauses ensured that the Lombard crown would not be disputed if the king of Bohemia managed to obtain it. Philip selected Bonne of Bohemia as a wife for his son, as she was closer to child-bearing age (16 years), and the dowry was fixed at 120,000 florins.

John reached the age of majority, 13 years and one day, on 27 April 1332, and received overlordship of the duchy of Normandy, as well as the counties of Anjou and Maine. The wedding was celebrated on 28 July at the church of Notre-Dame in Melun in the presence of six thousand guests. The festivities were prolonged by a further two months when the young groom was finally knighted at the cathedral of Notre-Dame in Paris. As the new Duke of Normandy, John was solemnly granted the arms of a knight in front of a prestigious assembly bringing together the kings of Bohemia and Navarre, and the dukes of Burgundy, Lorraine and Brabant.

Duke of Normandy

Accession and rise of the English and the royalty
Upon his accession as Duke of Normandy in 1332, John had to deal with the reality that most of the Norman nobility was already allied with the English camp. Effectively, Normandy depended economically more on maritime trade across the English Channel than on river trade on the Seine. Although the duchy had not been in Angevin possession for 150 years, many landowners had holdings across the Channel. Consequently, to line up behind one or other sovereign risked confiscation. Therefore, Norman members of the nobility were governed as interdependent clans, which allowed them to obtain and maintain charters guaranteeing the duchy a measure of autonomy. It was split into two key camps, the counts of Tancarville and the counts of Harcourt, which had been in conflict for generations.

Tension arose again in 1341. King Philip, worried about the richest area of the kingdom breaking into bloodshed, ordered the bailiffs of Bayeux and Cotentin to quell the dispute. Geoffroy d'Harcourt raised troops against the king, rallying a number of nobles protective of their autonomy and against royal interference. The rebels demanded that Geoffroy be made duke, thus guaranteeing the autonomy granted by the charter. Royal troops took the castle at Saint-Sauveur-le-Vicomte and Geoffroy was exiled to Brabant. Three of his companions were decapitated in Paris on 3 April 1344.

Meeting with the Avignon Papacy and the King of England

In 1342, John was in Avignon, then a part of the Papal States, at the coronation of Pope Clement VI, and in the latter part of 1343, he was a member of a peace parley with Edward III of England's chancery clerk. Clement VI was the fourth of seven Avignon Popes whose papacy was not contested, although the supreme pontiffs would ultimately return to Rome in 1378.

Relations with Normandy and rising tensions 

By 1345, increasing numbers of Norman rebels had begun to pay homage to Edward III, constituting a major threat to the legitimacy of the Valois kings. The defeat at the Battle of Crécy on 26 August 1346, and the capitulation of Calais on 3 August 1347, after an eleven-month siege, further damaged royal prestige. Defections by the nobility, whose land fell within the broad economic influence of England, particularly in the north and west, increased. Consequently, King Philip VI decided to seek a truce. Duke John met Geoffroy d'Harcourt, to whom the king agreed to return all confiscated goods, even appointing him sovereign captain in Normandy. John then approached the Tancarville family, whose loyalty could ultimately ensure his authority in Normandy. The marriage of John, Viscount of Melun, to Jeanne, the only heiress of the county of Tancarville, ensured that the Melun-Tancarville party remained loyal to John, while Geoffroy d'Harcourt continued to act as defender for Norman freedoms and thus of the reforming party.

Black Death and second marriage

On 11 September 1349, John's wife, Bonne of Bohemia (Bonne de Luxembourg), died at the Maubuisson Abbey near Paris, of the Black Death, which was devastating Europe. To escape the pandemic, John, who was living in the Parisian royal residence, the Palais de la Cité, left Paris.

On 9 February 1350, five months after the death of his first wife, John married Joan I, Countess of Auvergne, in the royal Château de Sainte-Gemme (that no longer exists), at Feucherolles, near Saint-Germain-en-Laye.

King of France

Coronation
Philip VI, John's father, died on 22 August 1350, and John's coronation as John II, king of France, took place in Reims the following 26 September. Joanna, his second wife, was crowned queen of France at the same time.

In November 1350, King John had Raoul II of Brienne, Count of Eu seized and summarily executed, for reasons that remain unclear, although it was rumoured that he had pledged the English the County of Guînes for his release.

Negotiations and falling out with Navarre

In 1354, John's son-in-law and cousin, Charles II of Navarre, who, in addition to his Kingdom of Navarre in the Pyrenees mountains, bordering between France and Spain, also held extensive lands in Normandy, was implicated in the assassination of the Constable of France, Charles de la Cerda, who was the favorite of King John. Nevertheless, in order to have a strategic ally against the English in Gascony, John signed the Treaty of Mantes with Charles on 22 February 1354. The peace did not last between the two, and Charles eventually struck up an alliance with Henry of Grosmont, the first Duke of Lancaster. 

The following year, on 10 September 1355 John and Charles signed the Treaty of Valognes, but this second peace lasted hardly any longer than the first, culminating in a highly dramatic event where, during a banquet on 5 April 1356 at the Royal Castle in Rouen attended by the King's son Charles, Charles II of Navarre, and a number of Norman magnates and notables of the French king burst through the door in full armor, swords in hand, along with his entourage, which included the king's brother Phillip, younger son Louis and cousins, as well as over a hundred fully armed knights waiting outside. John lunged over and grabbed Charles of Navarre shouting, "let no one move if he does not want to be dead with this sword." With John's son, Dauphin Charles, the banquet host, on his knees pleading for him to stop, the King grabbed Navarre by the throat and pulled him out of his chair yelling in his face, "Traitor, you are not worthy to sit at my son's table!" He then ordered the arrests of all the guests including Navarre and, in what many considered to be a rash move as well as a political mistake, he had John, the Count of Harcourt and several other Norman lords and notables summarily executed later that night in a yard nearby while he stood watching. 

This act, which was largely driven by revenge for Charles of Navarre's and John of Harcourt's pre-meditated plot that killed John's favorite, Charles de La Cerda, would push much of what remaining support the King had from the lords in Normandy away to King Edward and the English camp, setting the stage for the English invasion and the resulting Battle of Poitiers in the months to come.

Battle of Poitiers
In 1355, the Hundred Years' War had flared up again, and on July 1356, Edward, the Black Prince, son of Edward III of England, took an army on a great chevauchée through France. John pursued him with an army of his own. In September the two forces met a few miles southeast of Poitiers.

John was confident of victory—his army was probably twice the size of his opponent's—but he did not immediately attack. While he waited, the papal legate went back and forth, trying to negotiate a truce between the leaders. There is some debate over whether the Black Prince wanted to fight at all. He offered his wagon train, which was heavily loaded with loot. He also promised not to fight against France for seven years. Some sources claim that he even offered to return Calais to the French crown. John countered by demanding that 100 of the Prince's best knights surrender themselves to him as hostages, along with the Prince himself. No agreement could be reached. Negotiations broke down, and both sides prepared for combat.

On the day of the battle, John and 17 knights from his personal guard dressed identically. This was done to confuse the enemy, who would do everything possible to capture the sovereign on the field. In spite of this precaution, following the destruction and routing of the massive force of French knights at the hands of the ceaseless English longbow volleys, John was captured as the English force charged to finish their victory. Though he fought with valor, wielding a large battle-axe, his helmet was knocked off. Surrounded, he fought on until Denis de Morbecque, a French exile who fought for England, approached him.

"Sire," Morbecque said. "I am a knight of Artois. Yield yourself to me and I will lead you to the Prince of Wales."

Surrender and capture
King John surrendered by handing him his glove. That night King John dined in the red silk tent of his enemy. The Black Prince attended to him personally. He was then taken to Bordeaux, and from there to England. The Battle of Poitiers would be one of the major military disasters not just for France, but at any time during the Middle Ages.

While negotiating a peace accord, John was at first held in the Savoy Palace, then at a variety of locations, including Windsor, Hertford, Somerton Castle in Lincolnshire, Berkhamsted Castle in Hertfordshire, and briefly at King John's Lodge, formerly known as Shortridges, in East Sussex. Eventually, John was taken to the Tower of London.

Prisoner of the English

As a prisoner of the English, John was granted royal privileges that permitted him to travel about and enjoy a regal lifestyle. At a time when law and order was breaking down in France and the government was having a hard time raising money for the defence of the realm, his account books during his captivity show that he was purchasing horses, pets, and clothes while maintaining an astrologer and a court band.

Treaty of Brétigny
The Treaty of Brétigny (drafted in May 1360) set his ransom at an astounding 3 million crowns, roughly two or three years worth of revenue for the French Crown, which was the largest national budget in Europe during that period. On 30 June 1360 John left the Tower of London and proceeded to Eltham Palace where Queen Philippa had prepared a great farewell entertainment. Passing the night at Dartford, he continued towards Dover, stopping at the Maison Dieu of St Mary at Ospringe, and paying homage at the shrine of St Thomas Becket at Canterbury on 4 July. He dined with the Black Prince—who had negotiated the Treaty of Brétigny—at Dover Castle, and reached English-held Calais on 8 July.

Leaving his son Louis of Anjou in Calais as a replacement hostage to guarantee payment, John was allowed to return to France to raise the funds. The Treaty of Brétigny was ratified in October 1360.

Louis' escape and returning to England
On 1 July 1363, King John was informed that Louis had broken his parole and escaped from Calais. Troubled by the dishonour of this action, and the arrears in his ransom, John gathered his royal council to announce that he would voluntarily return to captivity in England and negotiate with Edward in person. When faced with the opposition of his advisors, the king famously replied that "if good faith were banned from the Earth, 
she ought to find asylum in the hearts of kings". Immediately after he appointed his son Charles the Duke of Normandy to be regent and governor of France until his return.

Death
John landed in England in January 1364 where he was met by Sir Alan Buxhull, Sir Richard Pembridge and Lord Burghersh at Dover, to be conducted to Eltham and the Savoy Palace and was warmly welcomed in London in January 1364.  He was received with great honor, and was a frequent guest of Edward at Westminster. A few months after his arrival, however, he fell ill with an unknown malady. He died at the Savoy Palace in April 1364. His body was returned to France, where he was interred in the royal chambers at Saint Denis Basilica.

Personality

Physical strength

John suffered from fragile health. He engaged little in physical activity, practised jousting rarely, preferring hunting. Contemporaries report that he was quick to get angry and resort to violence, leading to frequent political and diplomatic confrontations. He enjoyed literature and was patron to painters and musicians.

Image

The image of a "warrior king" probably emerged from the courage he displayed at the Battle of Poitiers, where he dismounted to fight in the forefront of his surrounded men with a poleaxe in his hands, as well as the creation of the Order of the Star. This was guided by political need, as John was determined to prove the legitimacy of his crown, particularly as his reign, like that of his father, was marked by continuing disputes over the Valois claim from both Charles II of Navarre and Edward III of England. From a young age, John was called to resist the decentralising forces affecting the cities and the nobility, each attracted either by English economic influence or the reforming party. He grew up among intrigue and treason, and in consequence he governed in secrecy only with a close circle of trusted advisers.

Personal relationships

He took as his wife Bonne of Bohemia and fathered 11 children in eleven years. 
Due to his close relationship with his favourite Charles de la Cerda, partisans of Charles II of Navarre derided the king for "having no other God than him".  La Cerda was given various honours and appointed to the high position of connetable when John became king; he accompanied the king on all his official journeys to the provinces. La Cerda's rise at court excited the jealousy of the French barons, several of whom stabbed him to death in 1354. La Cerda's fate paralleled that of Edward II of England's Piers Gaveston and John II of Castile's Álvaro de Luna; the position of a royal favourite was a dangerous one. John's grief on La Cerda's death was overt and public.

Ancestry

Issue
On 28 July 1332, at the age of 13, John was married to Bonne of Luxembourg (d. 1349), daughter of John, King of Bohemia. Their children were:

 Charles V of France (21 January 1338 – 16 September 1380)
Catherine (1338–1338) died young
 Louis I, Duke of Anjou (23 July 1339 – 20 September 1384), married Marie of Blois
 John, Duke of Berry (30 November 1340 – 15 June 1416), married Jeanne of Auvergne
 Philip II, Duke of Burgundy (17 January 1342 – 27 April 1404), married Margaret of Flanders
 Joan (24 June 1343 – 3 November 1373), married Charles II (the Bad) of Navarre
 Marie (12 September 1344 – October 1404), married Robert I, Duke of Bar
 Agnes (9 December 1345April 1350)
 Margaret (20 September 134725 April 1352)
 Isabelle (1 October 1348 – 11 September 1372), married Gian Galeazzo I, Duke of Milan

On 19 February 1350, at the royal Château de Sainte-Gemme, John married Joanna I of Auvergne (d. 1361), Countess of Auvergne and Boulogne. Joanna was the widow of Philip of Burgundy, the deceased heir of that duchy, and the mother of the young Philip I, Duke of Burgundy (1344–61) who became John's stepson and ward. John and Joanna had three children, all of whom died shortly after birth:
 Blanche (b. November 1350)
 Catherine (b. early 1352)
 a son (b. early 1353)

Succession

John II was succeeded by his son, Charles, who reigned as Charles V of France, known as The Wise.

References

|-

|-

1319 births
1364 deaths
14th-century kings of France
14th-century Dukes of Normandy
Ancien Régime
Counts of Anjou
French prisoners of war in the Hundred Years' War
House of Valois
Jure uxoris officeholders
People from Le Mans
People of the Hundred Years' War
Prisoners in the Tower of London
Monarchs taken prisoner in wartime
14th-century French people
14th-century peers of France
Burials at the Basilica of Saint-Denis
Sons of kings